Singireddy Hari Vardhan Reddy (born in Gowdavally Village, Medchal - Hyderabad,Telangana India) is an Indian politician and  currently serving as TPCC Senior Spokesperson, Medchal Constituency Co-ordinator and Medchal District Zilla Parishad Congress Party Floor Leader, Ex-Corporator & GHMC Standing committee member. Constituency Co-ordinator and Medchal District Zilla Parishad Congress Party Floor Leader, Ex-Corporator & GHMC Standing committee member.

Early life and education 

Singireddy Hari Vardhan Reddy was born in Gowdavally village, Medchal to Singireddy Madhav Reddy and Kamalamma.

References

External links 
 GHMC Website

Living people
1961 births
Indian National Congress
Politicians from Hyderabad, India
Telugu politicians
Telangana politicians